WIFR-LD (channel 23) is a low-power television station in Rockford, Illinois, United States, affiliated with CBS and The CW Plus. The station is owned by Gray Television, and maintains studios and transmitter facilities on North Meridian Road in Rockford.

Until 2017, WIFR operated as a full-power television station licensed to nearby Freeport. Under its current low-power license, WIFR-LD continues to use channel 23 as its virtual channel. WIFR is the only television station in the Rockford market to retain the same network affiliation since it first signed on.

Since WIFR's over-the-air coverage area is effectively limited to Rockford itself and close-in suburbs in Winnebago County, it relies mostly on cable and satellite for its viewership. It is also simulcast on a digital subchannel of NBC affiliate WREX (VHF channel 13.6, mapped to virtual channel 23.10).

History
The station went on the air as WCEE-TV on September 12, 1965. It was originally owned by Rock River Television Corporation. The area's previous CBS affiliate, WREX-TV, switched to ABC full-time, sending CBS to WCEE. It has been with CBS ever since, and is the only station in the market to have never switched affiliations. The call letters were changed to the present WIFR on June 1, 1977. General Media sold the station to Worrell Newspapers of Charlottesville, Virginia in September of that year. Worrell sold all three stations WIFR, WHSV-TV in Harrisonburg, Virginia and now-defunct WBNB-TV in Charlotte Amalie, U.S. Virgin Islands to Benedek Broadcasting in 1986. When Benedek went bankrupt in 2002, WIFR and WHSV were acquired by current owner Gray Television.

On the morning of July 5, 2003, a severe wind storm swept through Rockford. WIFR's transmitter tower, located behind the studio and office building at 2523 North Meridian Road in Rockford, collapsed. Pieces of the tower fell onto a field behind the station's headquarters. No one was injured or killed. Nearly four months later, a new tower was erected and WIFR's signal was back to full power once again.

Spectrum reallocation
Gray Television sold WIFR's spectrum in the Federal Communications Commission (FCC)'s incentive auction for $50,060,965; at the time, the station indicated that it planned to enter into a post-auction channel sharing agreement. On April 21, 2017, Gray requested special temporary authority to move the license of W22EE-D (channel 22), a low-power station it owns in Rockford, to channel 41 with the intent of using it to maintain CBS service in the market; in its request, Gray disclosed that the full-power WIFR license would be surrendered on May 31, 2017, though WIFR's existing transmitter would be still be used, but with its power restricted to meet the transmitting requirements for W22EE-D. The full-power license was cancelled on that date. Gray had acquired W22EE-D from DTV America in an eight-station deal in 2016; it had never commenced any previous on-air operations since the call letters were issued on May 17, 2011, nor constructed any facilities.

On November 18, 2019, WIFR-LD attempted a transfer to its post-reallocation channel 28 from a temporary lower-power antenna lower on their transmitter tower, but moved back to 41 in a matter of days with the permission of T-Mobile, which would eventually hold that spectrum. This is due to channel 28 also being allocated to the northeast in Milwaukee to full-power ABC affiliate WISN-TV and causing cross-channel interference in portions of Boone and McHenry counties. The station again transitioned to channel 28 permanently on January 15, 2020, this time arranging with Weigel Broadcasting to simulcast 23.1 over their low-power station in the market, WFBN-LD (channel 35) as subchannel 23.11 to address those over-the-air viewers experiencing interference from WISN-TV. Gray expects to transition to their regular higher-power signal at the former position of the channel 41 antenna soon, after the COVID-19 pandemic forced it to delay its completion from spring 2020 due to a lack of tower maintenance crews across the United States.

Through all of this, on-air operations continued mostly unchanged, though viewers were asked to rescan their sets in order to continue watching the station. However, few viewers lost access to CBS programming due to the high penetration of cable and satellite.

Gray Television acquisition of Quincy Media
On February 1, 2021, Gray Television announced it had acquired Quincy Media, owner of NBC affiliate WREX, for $925 million in a cash transaction. FCC rules governing television duopolies permit the common ownership of a full-power station and a low-power station in the same market. Despite this, Gray elected to retain WIFR and sell WREX to Allen Media Broadcasting, a subsidiary of Los Angeles based Entertainment Studios, on April 29, in a $380 million transaction that included several of WREX's Quincy Media sister stations in overlapping markets, including WKOW/Madison, WAOW/Wausau, WXOW/LaCrosse (and its semi-satellite WQOW/Eau Claire), KWWL/Waterloo–Cedar Rapids, and WSIL-TV/Carbondale (and its satellite KPOB-TV/Poplar Bluff). While Gray will not have any direct ownership or control of WREX, it hammered out a 10-year agreement with Allen Media which called for WREX to carry WIFR-LD's main channel on a WREX subchannel, which would give WIFR full-market coverage for the first time since it went to low-power status in 2017.

Technical information

Subchannels
The station's digital signal is multiplexed:

As noted in the last section, channel 23.11 is the fourth subchannel of Weigel Broadcasting's WFBN-LD (channel 35), which utilizes physical channel 23 post-spectrum.

WIFR added Tribune Broadcasting's Antenna TV as their second subchannel on December 17, 2012, replacing Local AccuWeather (known on-air as "23 WeatherNow"). The subchannel carries live local and regional sports, including Rockford IceHogs hockey. Until the 2020 move of all market sports rights to cable via NBC Sports Chicago and Marquee Sports Network, it carried the regional telecasts from WGN Sports of selected Chicago Bulls, Cubs, and White Sox games. On May 28, 2015, its third subchannel launched, taking an affiliation with the Justice Network on July 27; in the interim it carried that year's Rockford Public School District 205 graduation and overflow games unable to be aired on 23.2. 23.3 would carry White Sox games, with 23.2 carrying all Cubs games. During September 2017, WIFR announced via commercials running on the main signal that the subchannel would change affiliation to Cozi TV that month. 23.5 began carrying Stateline CW after it moved from WREX-DT2 in 2021.

Analog-to-digital conversion
WIFR shut down its analog signal, over UHF channel 23, at noon on February 17, 2009, the original target date in which full-power television stations in the United States were to transition from analog to digital broadcasts under federal mandate (which was later pushed back to June 12, 2009). The station's digital signal remained on its pre-transition UHF channel 41. Through the use of PSIP, digital television receivers display the station's virtual channel as its former UHF analog channel 23.

Notes

References

External links
 Official website
 

CBS network affiliates
Antenna TV affiliates
Cozi TV affiliates
Ion Television affiliates
Gray Television
Low-power television stations in the United States
IFR-LD
Television channels and stations established in 1965
1965 establishments in Illinois